Uranocircite or Uranocircite-II is a uranium mineral with the chemical formula: Ba(UO2)2(PO4)2·10H2O. Uranocircite-I was discredited (the IMA-CMNMC published 'The New IMA List of Minerals', September 2012). It is a phosphate mineral which contains barium and is a green to yellow colour.  It has a Mohs hardness of about 2.

Uranocircite was named after the Greek for "falcon" because it was discovered in Falkenstein, Germany. Uranocircite contains about 45% uranium in it and is mainly mined in Bergen in Saxony, Germany.

References

Webmineral data

Uranium(VI) minerals
Phosphate minerals
Tetragonal minerals
Minerals in space group 139